The Jarahi River, also spelt Jarrahi or Garrahi, is a major river in the Iranian province of Khuzestan. It originates in the southern Zagros mountains, and flowing westward, empties into the Shadegan/Falahhiya marshes.

The river was known as Hedyphon by the ancient Greeks.

References

Landforms of Khuzestan Province
Rivers in Mandaeism
Rivers of Khuzestan Province